The 2010 United States Senate election in Indiana took place on November 2, 2010, alongside 33 other elections to the United States Senate in other states and elections to the United States House of Representatives and various state and local elections to fill Indiana's class III United States Senate seat. Incumbent Democratic U.S. Senator Evan Bayh decided in February 2010 to retire instead of seeking a third term shortly after Republican former U.S. Senator Dan Coats, announced his candidacy for Bayh's contested seat. Bayh's announcement came one day before the filing deadline and no Democratic candidate submitted enough signatures by the deadline to run, so the State Democratic Party chose U.S. Congressman Brad Ellsworth as their nominee. The Libertarian Party nominated YMCA instructor Rebecca Sink-Burris, who had previously run against Evan Bayh in the 1998 United States Senate election in Indiana but with less success than in this election. Coats won the open seat.

Democratic nomination 
Senate candidates in Indiana were required to have submitted 500 signatures from each of the state's nine congressional districts by February 16, 2010, one day after Bayh announced his retirement. Democratic leaders thought the popular incumbent would run for reelection, and as a result, no Democratic candidate had submitted the requisite signatures by the deadline to run in the state's primary, meaning that the Indiana Democratic Party's executive committee chose the party's nominee. U.S. congressman Brad Ellsworth was officially selected on May 15.

Republican primary

Candidates 
 Don Bates, businessman
 Richard Behney, businessman
 Dan Coats, former U.S. Senator
 John Hostettler, former U.S. Representative
 Marlin Stutzman, State Senator

Debates 
 1. March 6
 2. April 8 (on the WXNT radio station)
 3. April 10
 4. April 19 (at Franklin College, on radio station WFCI)
 5. April 20 (televised on WFYI)

Endorsements

Coats

Hostettler

Stutzman

Polling

Results

General election

Candidates 
 Brad Ellsworth (D), U.S. Representative
 Dan Coats (R), former U.S. Senator
 Rebecca Sink-Burris (L), teacher and small business owner

Campaign 
After Coats' win in the Republican primary, Ellsworth began to heavily criticize Coats for his ties to lobbyists. He called for more disclosure of the meetings lawmakers have with lobbyists, banning congressional staff from lobbying for six years after their congressional jobs, requiring Congress members to put all their investments in blind trusts, more disclosure of Senate candidates' personal financial information, and changes to the U.S. Senate filibuster rules. He proposed lowering number of votes required to break a filibuster to 55 from the current 60. In response to Ellsworth's charges, Coats published his lobbying record in an 815-page document.

Coats emphasized the individual issues rather than ethic reforms advocated by his opponent. He focused on Ellsworth's record of voting in support of the Economic Stimulus Act of 2008, cap and trade legislation, and health care bill. Coats opinion of the healthcare law was that "the only responsible solution ... is to repeal the Obama-Pelosi-Ellsworth health spending bill and quickly replace it with cost-effective, incremental pieces that will decrease costs, increase coverage and not break the bank."

Debates 
The three candidates took part in three televised debates.

 Monday, October 11, in Indianapolis
 Friday, October 22, in Fort Wayne
 Monday, October 25, in Vincennes

Predictions

Polling

Fundraising

Results

See also 
 2010 Indiana elections
 2010 United States Senate elections

References

External links 
 Indiana Secretary of State Elections Division
 U.S. Congress candidates for Indiana at Project Vote Smart
 Indiana U.S. Senate from OurCampaigns.com
 Campaign contributions from Open Secrets
 Indiana Polls graph of multiple polls from Pollster.com
 Election 2010: Indiana Senate from Rasmussen Reports
 2010 Indiana Senate Race from Real Clear Politics
 2010 Indiana Senate Race from CQ Politics
 Race profile from The New York Times
Debates
 Indiana Senate Republican Primary Debate, C-SPAN, April 20, 2010
Official candidate sites (Archived)
 Dan Coats for Senate
 Brad Ellsworth for Senate
 Rebecca Sink-Burris for Senate

Senate
Indiana
2010